Aldehyde dehydrogenase 1 family, member A1, also known as ALDH1A1 or retinaldehyde dehydrogenase 1 (RALDH1), is an enzyme that is encoded by the ALDH1A1 gene.

Function 

This protein belongs to the aldehyde dehydrogenases family of proteins. Aldehyde dehydrogenase is the second enzyme of the major oxidative pathway of alcohol metabolism. Two major liver isoforms of this enzyme, cytosolic and mitochondrial, can be distinguished by their electrophoretic mobilities, kinetic properties, and subcellular localizations; this gene encodes the main cytosolic isoform, which has a lower affinity for aldehydes than the mitochondrial enzyme. Most Caucasians have two major isozymes, while approximately 50% of East Asians have only the cytosolic isozyme, missing the mitochondrial isozyme. A remarkably higher frequency of acute alcohol intoxication among East Asians than among Caucasians could be related to the absence of the mitochondrial isozyme. Furthermore, mutations in this enzyme have been linked to alcoholism in humans.

ALDH1A1 also belongs to the group of corneal crystallins that help maintain the transparency of the cornea.
ALDH1A1 maintains stemness of cancer cells and several drugs have been designed to target cancer stem cells by targeting ALDH1A1.

References

External links

Further reading 

 
 
 
 
 
 
 
 
 
 
 
 
 
 
 
 
 
 
 

Enzymes
Ophthalmology